Events in the year 1956 in Argentina.

Incumbents
President: Pedro Eugenio Aramburu
Vice President: Isaac Rojas

Governors
Buenos Aires Province: Juan María Mathet (until 15 November); Emilio A. Bonnecarrére (from 15 November)
Mendoza Province: Héctor Ladvocat (until 9 May); Isidoro Busquets (from 9 May)

Vice Governors
Buenos Aires Province: vacant

Events
January 22 – The Argentine Grand Prix is held in Buenos Aires and is won by Luigi Musso and Juan Manuel Fangio.
March 5 – Enactment of Decree Law 4161/56
June 9 – Juan Jose Valle launches a revolt against the government of President Aramburu. He and 26 others are executed after its failure.

Films
La pícara soñadora, starring Alfredo Alcón and Mirtha Legrand
El Último perro, directed by Lucas Demare and starring Hugo del Carril and Gloria Ferrandiz

Births
April 6 – Sebastian Spreng, artist
August 23 – Cris Morena, television producer, actress, television presenter, composer, musician, songwriter, writer, former fashion model and entrepreneur

Deaths
March 22 - Eduardo Lonardi, former president of Argentina from September-November 1955
April 3 – Carlos Ibarguren, academic, historian and politician (born 1877)
June 12 – Juan José Valle, Peronist military officer, executed by firing squad (born 1896)

See also
List of Argentine films of 1956

References

 
Years of the 20th century in Argentina